A paracervical block is an anesthetic procedure used in obstetrics and gynecology, in which a local anesthetic is injected into between two and six sites at a depth of 3–7 mm alongside the vaginal portion of the cervix in the vaginal fornices. In the United States, the paracervical block is underutilized during insertion if intrauterine devices (IUDs). There is speculation that this is related to the disproportionate under-researching of women's health.

It is used for various obstetric and gynecologic procedures, such as hysteroscopy and vacuum aspiration.
It is as efficient as intracervical block, according to a study on women undergoing vacuum aspiration with lidocaine as anesthetic agent. Addition of ketorolac may offer added benefit of improved pain control.

References

Further reading
 paracervical block

Obstetrical procedures
Female genital procedures
Regional anesthesia